Ali Azam is a Bangladesh Awami League politician and the former Member of Parliament from Comilla-3 in the first Jatiya Sangshad.

Birth and early life 
Ali Azam was born in Comilla district. He was elected a Member of Parliament from Comilla-3 constituency in the first parliamentary elections of 1973 on the nomination of Bangladesh Awami League.

References

Living people
1st Jatiya Sangsad members
People from Comilla
1959 births